"The Whisperer" is a song by French DJ and producer David Guetta, featuring the vocals of frequent collaborator, Australian singer Sia, taken from the former's sixth studio album, Listen. It was released, along with the album, on 24 November 2014. The song features Sia on vocals, and is noted as one of the standout tracks from the album, due to the absence of any synths, or electro house production, the other being "I'll Keep Loving You" that features Birdy and Jaymes Young, however that song features minimal synths. The song has charted in France.

Charts

Weekly charts

References

2014 songs
David Guetta songs
Sia (musician) songs
Songs written by David Guetta
Songs written by Giorgio Tuinfort
Songs written by Sia (musician)
Pop ballads
Song recordings produced by David Guetta